Sujawal is a city in Sindh, Pakistan.

Sujawal may also refer to;
Sujawal District, an administrative unit of Sindh, Pakistan

See also

Sujawas, a village in India
Sujowali, a human settlement in Pakistan
Sijawal Junejo, a human settlement in Punjab, Pakistan